Denis Claire Baudouin Mesritz (The Hague, November 16, 1919 – Rathenow, March 16, 1945 ) was a Dutch lawyer. He studied law at the University of Groningen until 1942. Jean Mesritz was his brother.

During the Second World War, Mesritz was active in the resistance. He was the founder of the underground newspaper De Toekomst “The Future” as well as being involved in “De Geus”, “Het Parool” and “Ons Volk”.  In addition, he was an initiator of what would become the National Resistance Committee. On May 16, 1944, he was arrested by the Germans on the Amsterdam-Hague train. He died at the age of 25 in the concentration camp in Rathenow and is buried at Ereveld Loenen.

Honours

He was posthumously awarded the Dutch Cross of Resistance.

References

External links
 Denis Claire Baudoin Mesritz at the Dutch Roll of Honour 1940-1945
 Denis Claire Baudoin Mesritz Digital Jewish Monument

Dutch resistance members
Recipients of the Dutch Cross of Resistance
University of Groningen alumni
20th-century Dutch lawyers
1919 births
1945 deaths
Dutch people who died in Nazi concentration camps